

The Aeromot AMT-600 Guri is a two-seater light aircraft with a low cantilever wing and fixed tricycle landing gear from Brazil.

Design and Development
Derived from the Ximango glider series, this aircraft was ordered in series to replace the Aero Boero AB-115 as the basic training aircraft in Brazilian flying clubs and the first production aircraft left the factory on November 11, 2003.

On February 21, 2004 Aeromot and Guizhou Aircraft Industry Corporation signed an agreement to produce in China a retractable landing gear version of the Guri for the Asian market. This agreement provides for the creation of a subsidiary, Ximango China, and the supply of 20% of the aircraft by Aeromot.

Specifications

References
Notes

Bibliography

Single-engined tractor aircraft
High-wing aircraft
1990s Brazilian civil trainer aircraft
Aircraft first flown in 1999